Gondomania, also known as Makyou Senshi, is a scrolling shooter arcade video game initially released in Japan in 1987. It was developed and published by Data East.

Plot 
The Gondos, a race of alien beings, steals your significant other and takes them to the planet of thorns. The premise of game is to take down the Gondos though various levels and boss fights. It takes place in a futuristic medieval world and includes dragons and soldiers.

Gameplay 
The game was designed for play on a classic arcade console. The two buttons activate the guns and throw a type of sub-weapon and the joystick allows you to move left, right, up, or down. A rotary joystick allows you to aim and fire sub-weapons in eight different directions. Similar to other scrolling shooters, Gondomania allows you to progress across the 10 levels. Enemies in Gondomania drop coins when they are defeated, which allows a player to purchase power-ups. This differs from typical scrolling shooters because it requires an additional layer of strategy to decide what to purchase and when, as opposed to the typical scrolling shooter where you receive pre-programmed power-ups.

References 

1987 video games
Arcade video games
Arcade-only video games
Data East arcade games
Shooter video games
Video games developed in Japan
Video games about extraterrestrial life
Video games set on fictional planets